Rose Street Market is an open-air artists' market where everything for sale is hand made. Founded in 2003, and open to the public from 11 am to 5 pm every Saturday and Sunday, it is located on Rose Street, Melbourne, Victoria, Australia..

History
The market opened in 2003 and welcomed the public to sell their own handmade products, it is a popular market for creative artists who are encouraged to book a space and sell their handmade art, jewellery, photographs, edibles, fashion and accessories. 

The Rose St. Artists' Market provides a platform for emerging artists and designers to showcase and sell their work without high retail/gallery commissions.

The Rose St. Artists' Market occupies an abandoned yard in the back streets of Fitzroy. It allows up to forty artists and designers to showcase their work each week, and is fast becoming Melbourne's most important home for independent art and design. It is divided into two areas - one outdoors and another area in a huge undercover warehouse space.

In 2013, on the second and third of November 2013, the market celebrated their tenth anniversary by having participating vendors price everything under ten dollars. The slogan for the event was "10 Years for $10," and featured live entertainment, giveaways, and food and drink specials.

Performers
The Rose St Artists’ Market also encourages performers and musicians of all genres to participate. Performers and stallholders go through a similar application process, although performers are asked to supply a short resume of works and shows. Examples may include YouTube clips or relevant mpegs.

Events
The market has hosted many events, including fashion shows during Spring Fashion Week.

Transport
There are two trams that travel from market to the city: the number 96 tram from Bourke Street or the number 112 tram from Collins Street. There is only 2-hour parking near the market, but you can park on Brunswick Street or Nicholson Street.

References

External links
 

Culture of Melbourne
Retail markets in Melbourne
Fitzroy, Victoria